The Maysan governorate election of 2009 was held on 31 January 2009 alongside elections for all other governorates outside Iraqi Kurdistan and Kirkuk.

Results 

|- style="background-color:#E9E9E9"
! style="text-align:left;vertical-align:top;" |Coalition 2005/2009!! Allied national parties !! Leader !!Seats (2005) !! Seats (2009) !! Change !!Votes
|-
| style="text-align:left;" |State of Law Coalition || style="text-align:left;" | Islamic Dawa Party || style="text-align:left;" |Nouri Al-Maliki|| 1 || 8 || +7|| 42,214
|-
| style="text-align:left;" |Al Mihrab Martyr List || style="text-align:left;" |ISCI|| style="text-align:left;" |Abdul Aziz al-Hakim|| 6 || 7 || +1 || 35,093
|-
| style="text-align:left;" |Independent Free Movement List || style="text-align:left;" |Sadrist Movement || style="text-align:left;" |Muqtada al-Sadr || 15 || 7 || -8 || 35,075
|-
| style="text-align:left;" |National Reform Trend || National Reform Trend || style="text-align:left;" |Ibrahim al-Jaafari|| – || 4 || +4 || 20,144
|-

| style="text-align:left;" |Islamic Dawa Party – Iraq Organization ||IDPIO  || style="text-align:left;" | || 5 || – || -5 || 
|-
| style="text-align:left;" |Al-Rida Center for Culture & Guidance ||  || style="text-align:left;" | || 3 || –  ||-3  || 
|-
| style="text-align:left;" |Gathering of the Independent Sons of Maysan ||  || || 2 || – ||-2  ||  
|-
| style="text-align:left;" |Iraqi Republican Group  ||  || style="text-align:left;" | ||2  || – ||-2  || 
|-
| style="text-align:left;" |Independent National Islamic Congregation ||  || style="text-align:left;" | || 1 ||-  ||-1  || 
|-
| style="text-align:left;" |Maysan Democratic Coalition  ||  || style="text-align:left;" | || 1 || – ||-1  ||  
|-
| style="text-align:left;" |Shi’ite Political Council  ||  || style="text-align:left;" | ||1  ||-  || -1 || 
|-
| style="text-align:left;" |Other Parties||  || ||  || ||  || 101,872
|-
| colspan=2 style="text-align:left;" |Total || || 41 || 26 || -15 || 234,398
|-
| colspan=5 style="text-align:left;" |Sources: this article – Al Sumaria – New York Times -
|}

References 

2009 Iraqi governorate elections